London Buses route 63 is a Transport for London contracted bus route in London, England. Running between Honor Oak and King's Cross, it is operated by Abellio London.

History

In 2003, route 63 was withdrawn between Honor Oak and Crystal Palace, replaced by route 363.

On 13th November 2021, route 63 passed to Abellio London using brand-new electric double decks.

Current route
Route 63 operates via these primary locations:
Honor Oak Forest Hill Tavern
Peckham Rye station  
Peckham High Street
Bricklayers Arms
New Kent Road
Elephant & Castle station  
St George's Circus
Southwark station 
Blackfriars Bridge
Blackfriars station  
Ludgate Circus
Fleet Street / City Thameslink station 
Farringdon station   
Clerkenwell Road
Mount Pleasant
King's Cross station   York Way

References

External links

Timetable

Bus routes in London
Transport in the London Borough of Camden
Transport in the London Borough of Southwark
Transport in the London Borough of Lewisham
Transport in the City of London